This article is about raw fish or shellfish. It includes marinated raw fish (soaked in a seasoned liquid) and raw fish which is lightly cured such as gravlax, but not fish which is fully cured (fermented, pickled, smoked or otherwise preserved).


Raw fish dishes

Health concerns

Parasites in fish are a natural occurrence and common. Though not a health concern in thoroughly cooked fish, parasites are a concern when consumers eat raw or lightly preserved fish such as sashimi, sushi, ceviche, and gravlax. The popularity of such raw fish dishes makes it important for consumers to be aware of this risk. Raw fish should be frozen to an internal temperature of −20 °C (−4 °F) for at least 7 days to kill parasites. It is important to be aware that home freezers may not be cold enough to kill parasites.

Traditionally, fish that live all or part of their lives in fresh water were considered unsuitable for sashimi due to the possibility of parasites (see sashimi article). Parasitic infections from freshwater fish are a serious problem in some parts of the world, particularly Southeast Asia. Fish that spend part of their life cycle in brackish or freshwater, like salmon are a particular problem. A study in Seattle, Washington showed that 100% of wild salmon had roundworm larvae capable of infecting people. In the same study farm raised salmon did not have any roundworm larvae.

Parasite infection by raw fish is rare in the developed world (fewer than 40 cases per year in the U.S.), and involves mainly three kinds of parasites: Clonorchis sinensis (a trematode/fluke), Anisakis (a nematode/roundworm) and Diphyllobothrium (a cestode/tapeworm). Infection risk of anisakis is particularly higher in fishes which may live in a river such as salmon (sake) in Salmonidae or mackerel (saba). Such parasite infections can generally be avoided by boiling, burning, preserving in salt or vinegar, or freezing overnight. In Japan it is common to eat raw salmon and ikura, but these foods are frozen overnight prior to eating to prevent infections from parasites, particularly anisakis.

See also

 Eating live seafood
 Lomi salmon
 List of fish dishes
 List of seafood dishes

References

Fish, Raw